The 2002 Atlantic 10 Conference Baseball Championship was held at Dodd Stadium in Norwich, CT from May 16 through 20 (preliminaries) and Pitt Field in Richmond, Virginia, from May 22 through 24 (championship series). It featured the top six regular-season finishers of the conference's 12 teams, regardless of division. 2002 was the first season that the tournament was expanded to six teams. Top-seeded Richmond defeated Massachusetts in the title game to win the tournament for the first time, earning the Atlantic 10's automatic bid to the 2002 NCAA Tournament.

Seeding and format 
The league's top six teams, based on winning percentage in the 24-game regular season schedule, qualified for the field. The top two teams in each division qualified for the tournament automatically; the two division winners, Massachusetts in the East and Richmond in the West, received the top two seeds and byes through to the second round of the double elimination tournament. The tournament was different from most double-elimination formats in that after the two finalists were decided, losses were erased, and a best-of-three series was played at a new site the following to decide the champion.

Bracket

All-Tournament Team 
The following players were named to the All-Tournament Team. George Washington outfielder Mike Bassett, one of five Colonials selected, was named Most Outstanding Player.

Three George Washington players had been named to the team before. Mike Bassett, who had been named in 2000 and 2001, was a third-time selection. Jeff Fertitta and Jake Wald, both named in 2001, were second-time selections.

References 

Tournament
Atlantic 10 Conference Baseball Tournament
Atlantic 10 Conference baseball tournament
Atlantic 10 Conference baseball tournament
Atlantic 10 Conference baseball tournament
21st century in Richmond, Virginia
College baseball tournaments in Connecticut
College baseball tournaments in Virginia
Norwich, Connecticut
Sports in Richmond, Virginia